Raichur Airport  is the small airport serving Raichur city in the Karnataka state of India. The airstrip was constructed in 1942 during World War II.

Historic landing
On 26 February 1957, when the Prime Minister of India Sri Jawaharlal Nehru was travelling on board a WIP IL-14, one of its engines caught fire. Its pilot, Sqn Ldr RA Rufus carried out an emergency landing at Raichur (a disused and unpaved surface). He was awarded Ashok Chakra for his presence of mind and dedication to the service.

Future developments
It has been proposed to upgrade the airstrip at Raichur into a minor airport.
In May 2021, the Airports Authority of India gave its technical approval for constructing a 1,800 metre long runway suitable for operations of ATR-72 sized aircraft, as requested by Karnataka State Industrial Infrastructure Development Corporation (KSIDC). A total of 402 acres of land will be reserved for the development of the airport. Yeramus located around 10 km away from city is chosen for airport construction.

References

Airports in Karnataka
Raichur
Buildings and structures in Raichur district
Airports established in 1942
1942 establishments in India
20th-century architecture in India